Messenia is a constituency in Peloponnese represented in the Hellenic Parliament. It elects five Members of Parliament (MPs) by the Reinforced proportional representation system of election. It comprises the Messenia Prefecture.

Its most high-profile MP is the former Prime Minister, Antonis Samaras of the New Democracy Party.

Election results

Legislative election

Members of Parliament

Current members
 Petros Konstantineas SYRIZA
 Panagiota Kozompoli-Amanatidi SYRIZA
 Georgios Katrougalos SYRIZA
 Antonis Samaras ND
 Dimitrios Koukoutsis XA

Members (Jan 2015 – Sep 2015)
 Petros Konstantineas SYRIZA
 Panagiota Kozompoli-Amanatidi SYRIZA
 Athanasios Petrakos SYRIZA
 Eleni Psarrea SYRIZA
 Antonis Samaras ND

Members of Parliament (2012–2015)
 Antonis Samaras ND
 Ioannis Lampropoulos ND
 Dimitrios Sampaziotis ND
 Athanasios Petrakos SYRIZA
 Dimitrios Koukoutsis XA

Notes and references

Parliamentary constituencies of Greece
Messenia